The Heritage may refer to:

 The Heritage, novel by Siegfried Lenz
 The Heritage (European Tour), a golf tournament that was part of the European Tour in 2004
 The Heritage (PGA Tour), a golf tournament that has been part of the U.S. PGA Tour since 1969
 The Heritage at Millennium Park, a skyscraper in Chicago completed in 2005
 The Heritage (film), a Danish drama film
 The Heritage, 2008 album by Her Name Is Calla
 The Heritage School, Kolkata

See also
 Heritage (disambiguation)